The City of Carlisle is a local government district of Cumbria, England, with the status of a city and non-metropolitan district. It is named after its largest settlement, Carlisle, but covers a far larger area which includes the towns of Brampton and Longtown, as well as outlying villages including Dalston, Scotby and Wetheral.

The current city boundaries were set as part of the provisions of the Local Government Act 1972, and cover an amalgamation of two former local government districts, the City and County Borough of Carlisle and the Border Rural District of Cumberland. The City of Carlisle shares a border with Scotland (to the north), and is bounded on the southwest by the borough of Allerdale, and on the south by the district of Eden. The county of Northumberland is to the east.

Although the present boundaries date to the 20th century, the city traces its origins to a 1st-century Roman outpost associated with Hadrian's Wall. The Brythonic settlement that expanded from this outpost was destroyed by the Danes in 875. Thereafter the region formed part of the Southern Uplands of Scotland, until colonised under King William II of England in 1092. William II built Carlisle Castle, which houses a military museum. Carlisle Cathedral, founded in the 12th century, is one of the smallest in England.

A border city, and the third most northerly city in England, Carlisle predominantly spans the flood plain of the River Eden. Commercially, it is linked to the rest of England via the M6 motorway, and to the Scottish Lowlands via the A74(M) and M74 motorways.

In July 2021 the Ministry of Housing, Communities and Local Government announced that in April 2023, Cumbria will be reorganised into two unitary authorities.  Carlisle City Council is to be abolished and its functions transferred to a new authority, to be known as Cumberland, which will cover the current districts of Allerdale, Carlisle, and Copeland.

History

Following both the Local Government Act 1888 and Local Government Act 1894, local government in England had been administered via a national framework of rural districts, urban districts, municipal boroughs and county boroughs, which (apart from the latter which were independent), shared power with strategic county councils of the administrative counties. The areas that were incorporated into the City of Carlisle in 1974 had formed part of the Border Rural District from the administrative county of Cumberland, and the politically independent County Borough of Carlisle.

After the exploration of reform during the mid-20th century such as the proposals made by the Redcliffe-Maud Report in the late 1960s, the Local Government Act 1972 restructured local government in England by creating a system of two-tier metropolitan and non-metropolitan counties and districts throughout the country. The act formally established the City of Carlisle as a local government district of the new shire county of Cumbria on 1 April 1974. The new dual local authorities of Carlisle City Council and Cumbria County Council had been running since elections in 1973 however. The leading article in The Times on the day the Local Government Act came into effect claimed that the "new arrangement is a compromise which seeks to reconcile familiar geography which commands a certain amount of affection and loyalty, with the scale of operations on which modern planning methods can work effectively".

Governance

Parliamentary constituencies
The residents of the City of Carlisle are represented in the House of Commons of the United Kingdom by members of parliament (MPs) for two parliamentary constituencies. At the 2019 general election, Conservative Party MPs won the seats of Carlisle and Penrith and The Border, John Stevenson and Neil Hudson respectively.

Council

In 1974, Carlisle City Council was created to administer the newly formed non-metropolitan district, which shares power with the strategic Cumbria County Council. The council offices are located in Carlisle, at the Civic Centre. The Labour Party controlled the council for much of the first 25 years and from 1979 to the 1999 election had an overall majority. Until 2003 the Conservative Party then controlled the council with a majority, and from the 2003 elections they ran the council with no majority, but in alliance with the Liberal Democrats. At the 2012 election Labour gained a majority of the seats, which they held until the 2019 local election when the Conservative Party retook the council with the backing of the one Liberal Democrat, one UKIP councillor, and an Independent. In May 2021, three city council by-elections took place, triggered by the departure of three Labour councillors, that resulted in two Conservative gains from Labour. 

In November 2021, the former chair of the Labour Party, Jo Ellis-Williams, joined the Conservatives to give overall control of the council to the Conservative Party.

Electoral wards
There are 39 councillors representing the electoral wards of the City of Carlisle. Together they form the Carlisle City Council. Councillors are elected and accountable to the residents of their wards.

Parishes

Civil parishes form the bottom tier of local government in England; parish councils are consulted on planning applications and commonly manage some local services, such as allotments, burial grounds, bus shelters, car parks, and commons. The City of Carlisle is almost entirely parished, the exception being the central settlement of Carlisle—an unparished area. As of 2008, there were 36 civil parishes in the city, covered by 34 parish councils, which are:

Coat of arms

The coat of arms of Carlisle City Council are those granted to the city council of the County Borough of Carlisle by the College of Arms on 7 July 1924. These arms are derived from more ancient designs of or relating to Carlisle and its governance.

The city council's coat of arms are emblematic of the city's history. The arms incorporate a golden shield with a red cross, upon a green mount, surmounted by a mural crown, relating to Carlisle's history as an ancient walled city. This is supported by two red wyverns—legendary dragons used in heraldry—their wings strewn with golden roses, with reference to the city's Brythonic history. The motto beneath the arms comes from Thomas Wolsey's speech to Thomas Cromwell, in Shakespeare's play, Henry VIII: Be just and fear not.

Geography

The City of Carlisle is located at the extreme north of North West England. It encompasses Cumbria's county town, Carlisle, and its surrounding rural hinterland, which together total , making the city the largest in England by area. Although 70% of the city's 100,750 people live in central Carlisle, 98% of the city's land use is rural. The city is traversed by several major rivers, including the Caldew, Eden, and Petteril, and is bisected by the M6, A74(M) motorways.

Along the City of Carlisle's northern extent is the Solway Firth, which forms the western section of the Anglo-Scottish border, and thus divides the city from Dumfries and Galloway, one of the council areas of Scotland. To the east is the English county of Northumberland; to the south is the district of Eden and to the west and south-west the borough of Allerdale, both in the county of Cumbria.

Much of the city spans the flood plain of the River Eden resulting in large parts of the district being vulnerable to flooding. Two further tributaries, the Petteril and Caldew nearly surround the historic walled centre.

Carlisle experiences an oceanic climate (Köppen climate classification Cfb).

Demography

At the 2011 UK census, the City of Carlisle had a total population of 107,524. 46.8% of the residents over the age of 16 were married or in a registered same-sex civil partnership, 11.9% were co-habiting couples, and 41.2% were not living in a couple.

In 1841, 15.7% of Carlisle's population was middle class compared to 14% in England and Wales; this increased to 18.9% in 1931 (15% nationally) and 35.7% in 2001 (48% nationally). Carlisle's proportion of working-class people increased slowly from 1841 to 1931, changing from 33.0% to 37.9 while the national average changed from 37% to 36% in the same period. Since 1931 it has fallen and risen again to 34.0% in 2001 (26% nationally). The rest of the population was made up of clerical workers and skilled manual workers.

Population change
The table below details the population change since 1801, including the percentage change since the last available census data. Although the City of Carlisle has existed as a district since 1974, figures have been generated by combining data from the towns, villages, and civil parishes that would later be constituent parts of the city.

Religion

At the 2011 UK census, 69.1% of Carlisle's residents reported themselves as Christian, 22.9% had no religion and 6.8% did not state any religion. Other religions were represented with 0.4% of residents Muslim, 0.3% Buddhist, 0.2% Hindu and 0.3% had an alternative religion. The city is covered by the Roman Catholic Diocese of Lancaster, and the Church of England Diocese of Carlisle.

Economy

At the United Kingdom Census 2001, Carlisle had 73,431 residents aged 16 to 74. Of these people, 2.4% were students with jobs, 3.1% students without jobs, 4.9% looking after home or family, 6.1% permanently sick or disabled and 2.3% economically inactive for other reasons.

In 2001, of 46,858 residents of the City of Carlisle in employment, the industry of employment was 20.4% retail and wholesale, 15.9% manufacturing, 11.1% health and social work, 8.1% property and business services, 7.7% transport and communications, 7.3% construction, 6.4% education, 5.9% hotels and restaurants, 5.8% public administration and defence, 3.1% agriculture, 2.3% finance, 0.7% energy and water supply, 0.3% mining, and 4.5% other. This was roughly in line with national figures, although the proportion of jobs in agriculture which was more than the national average of 1.5% and the percentage of people working in finance was less than half the national average of 4.8%; the proportion of people working in property was also below the national average of 13.2%.

Transport

Railway
 
Carlisle railway station located on the West Coast Main Line and serves the Settle and Carlisle Line, Tyne Valley Line, Cumbrian Coast Line and trains to South West Scotland.

Air

The city has an airport, Carlisle Lake District Airport, owned by Ettyl. After a 25-year absence, commercial flights returned to the airport in July 2019 with a single airline, Loganair, providing services to London Southend, Belfast City and Dublin. In March 2020, however, the airline permanently suspended all flights from the airport due to the impact of the COVID-19 pandemic.

Buses
Carlisle bus station serves the City of Carlisle and is operated by Stagecoach on Lonsdale Street in the city centre.

Twin cities
Carlisle has formal twinning arrangements with two northern border cities on mainland Europe and one in North America. They are since 1961 Flensburg in northern Germany, since 1987 Słupsk in northern Poland and since 1991 Oattess in southern Canada.

Notable people
 List of people associated with Carlisle

Freedom of the City
The following people and military units have received the Freedom of the City of Carlisle.

Individuals
 Prince Christian of Schleswig-Holstein: 7 July 1902.
 The Princess of Wales: 29 January 1986.
 Ivor Broadis: 8 October 2018.

Military Units
 RAF Spadeadam: 2 June 2018.

References

Citations

Bibliography

External links

Carlisle City Council

 
1974 establishments in England
Cities in North West England
Non-metropolitan districts of Cumbria
Boroughs in England